Visa requirements for Honduran citizens are administrative entry restrictions by the authorities of other states placed on citizens of Honduras. As of 2 July 2019, Honduran citizens had visa-free or visa on arrival access to 135 countries and territories, ranking the Honduran passport 37th in terms of travel freedom (tied with the passports of Dominica and El Salvador) according to the Henley Passport Index.


Visa requirements map

Visa requirements
Visa requirements for holders of normal passports traveling for tourist purposes:

Dependent, Disputed, or Restricted territories
Unrecognized or partially recognized countries

Dependent and autonomous territories

See also
Visa policy of Honduras
Honduran passport

References and Notes
References

Notes

Honduras
Foreign relations of Honduras